In number theory, a factorion in a given number base  is a natural number that equals the sum of the factorials of its digits. The name factorion was coined by the author Clifford A. Pickover.

Definition
Let  be a natural number.

 
is the value of the th digit of the number.

For example, the number 145 in base  is a factorion because . 

For , the sum of the factorials of the digits is simply the number of digits  in the base 2 representation since . 

This is because all natural numbers of base  with  digits satisfy . For , the number of digits  for any number, once again, making it a preperiodic point. This means also that there are a finite number of factorions and cycles for any given base . 

Factorions for

b = (k − 1)!
Let  be a positive integer and the number base . Then:

b = k! − k + 1
Let  be a positive integer and the number base . Then:

Table of factorions and cycles of  
All numbers are represented in base .

See also
 Arithmetic dynamics
 Dudeney number
 Happy number
 Kaprekar's constant
 Kaprekar number
 Meertens number
 Narcissistic number
 Perfect digit-to-digit invariant
 Perfect digital invariant
 Sum-product number

References

External links
 Factorion at Wolfram MathWorld

Arithmetic dynamics
Base-dependent integer sequences